Portugal was represented by Fernando Tordo, with the song "Tourada", at the 1973 Eurovision Song Contest, which took place on 7 April in Luxembourg City. "Tourada" was chosen as the Portuguese entry at the Grande Prémio TV da Canção Portuguesa on 26 February.

Before Eurovision

Festival da Canção 1973
The Grande Prémio TV da Canção Portuguesa 1973 was held at the Teatro Maria Matos in Lisbon, hosted by Alice Cruz and Artur Agostinho. Ten songs took part in the final. This event was also marked by the return of Simone de Oliveira to the songs, after being unable to sing for about 3 years. This singer was awarded the Interpretation Award for her performance in "Apenas o meu povo". The results were determined by a distrital jury, that had 20 votes each, and a selection jury, composed of nine elements, to vote, each one with 10 votes to distribute among the songs in the contest

Controversy 
"Tourada" became very controversial after the night of the Festival because this poem was much more than a song with a bullfighting content, this song cheated the regime of the time, insofar as it was a sharp criticism of the current political and social regime. The possibility was still raised of not allowing "Tourada" to go to Eurovision, but the fears of the negative repercussions that this attitude would have internationally spoke louder and so the political power let Fernando Tordo take Tourada" to Eurovision.

At Eurovision 
On the night of the final Tordo performed 3rd in the running order, following Belgium and preceding Germany. At the close of the voting the song had received 80 points, coming 10th in the field of 17 competing countries. The orchestra during the Portuguese entry was conducted by Jorge Costa Pinto.

Voting

References 

1973
Countries in the Eurovision Song Contest 1973
Eurovision